The Anglican Diocese of Isuikwuato is one of nine within the Anglican Province of Aba, itself one of 14 provinces within the Church of Nigeria. The current bishop is Manasses Chijiokem Okere

The pioneer Bishop of Isuikwuato was Samuel Chibueze Chukwuka, installed on 13 March  2005. On his retirement in 2013, Manasses Chijiokem Okere became the second bishop.

Notes

Church of Nigeria dioceses
Dioceses of the Province of Aba